This is a list of 182 species in Hylesinus, a genus of crenulate bark beetles in the family Curculionidae.

Hylesinus species

 Hylesinus abietinus Fabricius, J.C., 1801 c
 Hylesinus aculeatus Say, 1824 i c b  (eastern ash bark beetle)
 Hylesinus adspersus Passerini, 1843 c
 Hylesinus aeneipennis Fabricius, J.C., 1801 c
 Hylesinus aesculi  c g
 Hylesinus africanus Schedl, 1965f c
 Hylesinus alternans Schedl, 1959j c
 Hylesinus angustatus Gyllenhal, 1813 c
 Hylesinus antipodus Schedl, 1951d c
 Hylesinus aspericollis Leconte, 1876 c
 Hylesinus ater  c
 Hylesinus atomarius Chapuis, 1869 c
 Hylesinus attenuatus Erichson, 1836 c
 Hylesinus aubei Perris, 1855 c
 Hylesinus aztecus Wood, 1980b c
 Hylesinus bakeri Sampson, 1921 c
 Hylesinus bicolor Brullé, 1832 c
 Hylesinus botscharnikovi Stark, V.N., 1931c c
 Hylesinus brevicollis Kolenati, 1846 c
 Hylesinus brevipes Fabricius, J.C., 1801 c
 Hylesinus brevipilosus Schedl, 1942c c
 Hylesinus brevis Gistel, 1848 c
 Hylesinus brunneus Erichson, 1836 c
 Hylesinus californicus (Swaine, 1916) i c b  (western ash bark beetle)
 Hylesinus canaliculatus Fabricius, J.C., 1801 c
 Hylesinus caseariae Wood, 1986c c
 Hylesinus chloropus Duftschmidt, 1825 c
 Hylesinus cholodkovskyi Berger, 1916 c
 Hylesinus cingulatus Blandford, 1894c c
 Hylesinus coadunatus Stephens, 1829 c
 Hylesinus cordipennis Lea, 1910 c
 Hylesinus corticiperda Erichson, 1836 c
 Hylesinus costatus Blandford, 1894c c
 Hylesinus crassus Beeson, 1929 c
 Hylesinus crenatulus Duftschmidt, 1825 c
 Hylesinus crenatus Panzer, 1813 c g
 Hylesinus criddlei (Swaine, 1918) i c b
 Hylesinus cristatus LeConte, 1868 c
 Hylesinus cunicularius Erichson, 1836 c
 Hylesinus curvifer Walker, F., 1859 c
 Hylesinus debilis Schedl (Chapuis in), 1958k c
 Hylesinus decumanus Erichson, 1836 c
 Hylesinus denticulosus Sokanovskii, B.V., 1956 c
 Hylesinus despectus Walker, F., 1859 c
 Hylesinus dolus Schedl, 1975e c
 Hylesinus dromiscens Scudder, S.H., 1893 c
 Hylesinus elatus Niisima, 1913a c
 Hylesinus elegans Thomson, J., 1858 c
 Hylesinus elongatus Schedl, 1942c c
 Hylesinus eos Spessivtsev, P., 1919 c
 Hylesinus esau Gredler, 1866 c
 Hylesinus extractus Scudder, S.H., 1893 c
 Hylesinus facilis Heer, O., 1856 c g
 Hylesinus fasciatus LeConte, 1868 i c b
 Hylesinus fici Lea, 1904 c
 Hylesinus flavipes Panzer, 1795 c
 Hylesinus flavus Fabricius, J.C., 1801 c
 Hylesinus fraxini Fabricius, J.C., 1801 c
 Hylesinus fraxinoides Beeson, 1961 c
 Hylesinus furcatus Stephens, 1829 c
 Hylesinus fuscus Duftschmidt, 1825 c
 Hylesinus gibbus Fabricius, J.C., 1801 c
 Hylesinus globosus Eichhoff, 1868c c
 Hylesinus grandis Dejean, 1821 c
 Hylesinus granulifer Motschulsky, 1863 c
 Hylesinus graphus Duftschmid, 1825 c
 Hylesinus guatemalensis Wood, 1982b c
 Hylesinus haemorrhoidalis Stephens, 1829 c
 Hylesinus hederae Schmidt, 1843 c
 Hylesinus henscheli Knotek, 1892b c
 Hylesinus hispidus Klug, 1833 c
 Hylesinus hystrix LeConte, 1858 c
 Hylesinus impar Schedl, 1975g c
 Hylesinus imperialis Eichhoff, 1868c c
 Hylesinus indigenus Wollaston, 1864 c
 Hylesinus insularum Beeson, 1940 c
 Hylesinus interstitialis Lea, 1910 c
 Hylesinus javanus Eggers, 1923a c
 Hylesinus kraatzi Eichhoff, 1864b c
 Hylesinus laticollis Blandford, 1894c c
 Hylesinus ligniperda Gyllenhal, 1813 c
 Hylesinus linearis Erichson, 1836 c
 Hylesinus lineatus Foerster, B., 1891 c g
 Hylesinus lubarskii Stark, V.N., 1936a c
 Hylesinus luridus Dejean, 1821 c
 Hylesinus machilus Schedl, 1959j c
 Hylesinus maculatus Fabricius, J.C., 1801 c
 Hylesinus maculipennis Schedl, 1975g c
 Hylesinus mandshuricus Eggers, 1922c c
 Hylesinus marginatus Duftschmidt, 1825 c
 Hylesinus melanocephalus Fabricius, J.C., 1801 c
 Hylesinus mexicanus (Wood, 1956) i c b
 Hylesinus micans Ratzeburg, 1839 c
 Hylesinus minimus Fabricius, J.C., 1801 c
 Hylesinus minor Hartig, 1834 c
 Hylesinus minutus Fabricius, J.C., 1801 c
 Hylesinus nanus Schedl, 1940b c
 Hylesinus nebulosus LeConte, 1859 c
 Hylesinus neli Petrov & Zherikhin, 2004 c
 Hylesinus niger Fabricius, J.C., 1801 c
 Hylesinus nilgirinus Eggers, 1923a c
 Hylesinus nobilis Blandford, 1894c c
 Hylesinus obscurus Fabricius, J.C., 1801 c
 Hylesinus oleae Fabricius, J.C., 1801 c
 Hylesinus oleiperda Fabricius, J.C., 1801 c
 Hylesinus opaculus LeConte, 1868 c
 Hylesinus opacus Erichson, 1836 c
 Hylesinus oregonus (Blackman, 1943) i c
 Hylesinus orni Fuchs, 1906a c
 Hylesinus pacificus Beeson, 1929 c
 Hylesinus palliatus Gyllenhal, 1813 c
 Hylesinus papuanus Eggers, 1923a c
 Hylesinus paykulli Duftschmidt, 1825 c
 Hylesinus paykullii Duftschmid, 1825 c
 Hylesinus pellitus Schedl, 1955b c
 Hylesinus perrisi Chapuis, 1869 c
 Hylesinus persimilis Eggers, 1927c c
 Hylesinus pertinax Schedl, 1975g c
 Hylesinus philippinensis Eggers, 1923a c
 Hylesinus picipennis Stephens, 1829 c
 Hylesinus pictus Sturm, 1826 c
 Hylesinus pilifer Eggers, 1927a c
 Hylesinus pilosus Ratzeburg, 1837 c
 Hylesinus pilula Erichson, 1847 c
 Hylesinus piniperda Fabricius, J.C., 1801 c
 Hylesinus porcatus Chapuis, 1869 c
 Hylesinus porculus Erichson, 1836 c
 Hylesinus pravdini Stark, V.N., 1936a c
 Hylesinus prestae Costa, 1839 c
 Hylesinus pruinosus Eichhoff, 1868 i c b
 Hylesinus prutenskyi Sokanovskii, B.V., 1959a c
 Hylesinus pubescens Fabricius, J.C., 1801 c
 Hylesinus pusillus Gerstäcker, 1855 c
 Hylesinus putonii Eichhoff, 1868b c
 Hylesinus pygmaeus Fabricius, J.C., 1801 c
 Hylesinus retamae Perris, 1864a c
 Hylesinus reticulatus Chapuis, 1869 c
 Hylesinus rhododactylus Gyllenhal, 1827 c
 Hylesinus robustus Eggers, 1939d c
 Hylesinus samoanus Schedl, 1951k c
 Hylesinus scaber Stephens, 1829 c
 Hylesinus scabricollis Sturm, 1826 c
 Hylesinus scabrifrons Ratzeburg (St. in), 1839 c
 Hylesinus scobipennis Chapuis, 1869 c
 Hylesinus scolytus Fabricius, J.C., 1801 c
 Hylesinus scutulatus Blandford, 1894c c
 Hylesinus sericeus Stephens, 1829 c
 Hylesinus serraticornis Dejean, 1821 c
 Hylesinus serratus LeConte, 1868 c
 Hylesinus shabliovskyi Kurenzov, 1941a c
 Hylesinus similis Eggers, 1923a c
 Hylesinus simson Gistl, 1848 c
 Hylesinus sordidus Dejean, 1821 c
 Hylesinus spartii Nordlinger, 1847 c
 Hylesinus squamulatus Redtenbacher, 1858 c
 Hylesinus striatus Eggers, 1933b c
 Hylesinus subcostatus Eggers, 1923a c
 Hylesinus subopacus Eggers, 1930c c
 Hylesinus sulcinodis Schedl, 1974d c
 Hylesinus sumatranus Eggers, 1923a c
 Hylesinus suturalis Redtenbacher, 1842 c
 Hylesinus taranio Wood & Bright, 1992 c g
 Hylesinus tarsalis Forster, A., 1849 c
 Hylesinus tenebrosus Sahlberg C R, 1836 c
 Hylesinus tenerrimus Sahlberg C R, 1836 c
 Hylesinus terminatus Sahlberg, 1839 c
 Hylesinus testaceus Fabricius, J.C., 1801 c
 Hylesinus thujae Perris, 1855 c
 Hylesinus toranio (D'Anthoine, 1788) g
 Hylesinus trifolii Mueller, 1803 c
 Hylesinus tristis Blandford, 1894c c
 Hylesinus tupolevi Stark, V.N., 1936a c
 Hylesinus uniformis Endrödi, 1957a c
 Hylesinus varius (Fabricius, J.C., 1775) c g
 Hylesinus verae Petrov, 2002 c
 Hylesinus vestitus Mulsant & Rey, 1861b c
 Hylesinus vicinus Comolli, 1837 c
 Hylesinus villosus Fabricius, J.C., 1801 c
 Hylesinus vittatus Fabricius, J.C., 1801 c
 Hylesinus volvulus Fabricius, J.C., 1801 c
 Hylesinus wachtli Reitter, 1887b c
 Hylesinus wallacei Blandford, 1896b c

Data sources: i = ITIS, c = Catalogue of Life, g = GBIF, b = Bugguide.net

References

Hylesinus
Articles created by Qbugbot